Endometriosis is a disease of the female reproductive system in which cells similar to those in the endometrium, the layer of tissue that normally covers the inside of the uterus, grow outside the uterus. Lesions can be found on ovaries, fallopian tubes, tissue around the uterus and ovaries (peritoneum), intestines, bladder, and diaphragm; it may also occur in other parts of the body. Some symptoms include pelvic pain, heavy periods, pain with bowel movements, painful urination, and infertility. Nearly half of those affected have chronic pelvic pain, while in 70% pain occurs during menstruation. Pain during sexual intercourse is also common. Infertility occurs in up to half of affected individuals. About 25% of individuals have no symptoms and 85% of those seen with infertility in a tertiary center have no pain. Endometriosis can have both social and psychological effects.

The cause is not entirely clear. Risk factors include having a family history of the condition. The areas of endometriosis bleed each month (menstrual period), resulting in inflammation and scarring. The growths due to endometriosis are not cancer. Diagnosis is usually based on symptoms in combination with medical imaging; however, biopsy is the surest method of diagnosis. Other causes of similar symptoms include pelvic inflammatory disease, irritable bowel syndrome, interstitial cystitis, and fibromyalgia. Endometriosis is commonly misdiagnosed and females often report being incorrectly told their symptoms are trivial or normal. Females with endometriosis see an average of seven physicians before receiving a correct diagnosis, with an average delay of 6.7 years between the onset of symptoms and surgically obtained biopsies, the gold standard for diagnosing the condition. This average delay places endometriosis at the extreme end of diagnostic inefficiency.

Tentative evidence suggests that the use of combined oral contraceptives reduces the risk of endometriosis. Exercise and avoiding large amounts of alcohol may also be preventive. There is no cure for endometriosis, but a number of treatments may improve symptoms. This may include pain medication, hormonal treatments or surgery. The recommended pain medication is usually a non-steroidal anti-inflammatory drug (NSAID), such as naproxen. Taking the active component of the birth control pill continuously or using an intrauterine device with progestogen may also be useful. Gonadotropin-releasing hormone agonist (GnRH agonist) may improve the ability of those who are infertile to get pregnant. Surgical removal of endometriosis may be used to treat those whose symptoms are not manageable with other treatments.

One estimate is that 10.8 million people are affected globally . Other sources estimate 6 to 10% of the general female population and 2 to 11% of asymptomatic women are affected. In addition, 11% of women in a general population have undiagnosed endometriosis that can be seen on magnetic resonance imaging (MRI). Endometriosis is most common in those in their thirties and forties; however, it can begin in girls as early as eight years old. It results in few deaths with unadjusted and age-standardized death rates of 0.1 and 0.0 per 100,000. Endometriosis was first determined to be a separate condition in the 1920s. Before that time, endometriosis and adenomyosis were considered together. It is unclear who first described the disease.

Signs and symptoms

Pain and infertility are common symptoms, although 20–25% of women are asymptomatic. Presence of pain symptoms are associated with the type of endometrial lesions as 50% of women with typical lesions, 10% of women with cystic ovarian lesions, and 5% of women with deep endometriosis do not have pain.

Pelvic pain
A major symptom of endometriosis is recurring pelvic pain. The pain can range from mild to severe cramping or stabbing pain that occurs on both sides of the pelvis, in the lower back and rectal area, and even down the legs. The amount of pain a person feels correlates weakly with the extent or stage (1 through 4) of endometriosis, with some individuals having little or no pain despite having extensive endometriosis or endometriosis with scarring, while others may have severe pain even though they have only a few small areas of endometriosis. The most severe pain is typically associated with menstruation. Pain can also start a week before a menstrual period, during and even a week after a menstrual period, or it can be constant. The pain can be debilitating and result in emotional stress. Symptoms of endometriosis-related pain may include:
 dysmenorrhea (64%) – painful, sometimes disabling cramps during the menstrual period; pain may get worse over time (progressive pain), also lower back pains linked to the pelvis
 chronic pelvic pain – typically accompanied by lower back pain or abdominal pain
 dyspareunia – painful sexual intercourse
 dysuria – urinary urgency, frequency, and sometimes painful voiding
 mittelschmerz – pain associated with ovulation
 bodily movement pain – present during exercise, standing, or walking

Compared with patients with superficial endometriosis, those with deep disease appear to be more likely to report shooting rectal pain and a sense of their insides being pulled down. Individual pain areas and pain intensity appear to be unrelated to the surgical diagnosis, and the area of pain unrelated to the area of endometriosis.

There are multiple causes of pain. Endometriosis lesions react to hormonal stimulation and may "bleed" at the time of menstruation. The blood accumulates locally if it is not cleared shortly by the immune, circulatory, and lymphatic system. This may further lead to swelling, which triggers inflammation with the activation of cytokines, which results in pain. Another source of pain is the organ dislocation that arises from adhesion binding internal organs to each other. The ovaries, the uterus, the oviducts, the peritoneum, and the bladder can be bound together. Pain triggered in this way can last throughout the menstrual cycle, not just during menstrual periods.

Also, endometriotic lesions can develop their own nerve supply, thereby creating a direct and two-way interaction between lesions and the central nervous system, potentially producing a variety of individual differences in pain that can, in some cases, become independent of the disease itself. Nerve fibres and blood vessels are thought to grow into endometriosis lesions by a process known as neuroangiogenesis.

Infertility

About a third of women with infertility have endometriosis. Among those with endometriosis, about 40% are infertile. The pathogenesis of infertility is dependent on the stage of disease: in early stage disease, it is hypothesised that this is secondary to an inflammatory response that impairs various aspects of conception, whereas in later stage disease distorted pelvic anatomy and adhesions contribute to impaired fertilisation.

Other
Other symptoms include diarrhea or constipation, chronic fatigue, nausea and vomiting, migraines, low-grade fevers, heavy (44%) and/or irregular periods (60%), and hypoglycemia. There is an association between endometriosis and certain types of cancers, notably some types of ovarian cancer, non-Hodgkin's lymphoma and brain cancer. Endometriosis is unrelated to endometrial cancer.

Rarely, endometriosis can cause endometrium-like tissue to be found in other parts of the body. Thoracic endometriosis occurs when endometrium-like tissue implants in the lungs or pleura. Manifestations of this include coughing up blood, a collapsed lung, or bleeding into the pleural space. Endometriosis may also involve the nearby colon which in rare situations may  progress to partial obstruction requiring emergency surgery.

Stress may be a cause or a consequence of endometriosis.

Complications

Physical Health 
Complications of endometriosis include internal scarring, adhesions, pelvic cysts, chocolate cysts of ovaries, ruptured cysts, and bowel and ureter obstruction resulting from pelvic adhesions. Endometriosis-associated infertility can be related to scar formation and anatomical distortions due to the endometriosis.

Ovarian endometriosis may complicate pregnancy by decidualization, abscess and/or rupture.

Thoracic endometriosis can be associated with recurrent thoracic endometriosis syndrome at times of a menstrual period that includes catamenial pneumothorax in 73% of women, catamenial hemothorax in 14%, catamenial hemoptysis in 7%, and pulmonary nodules in 6%.

A 20-year study of 12,000 women with endometriosis found that individuals under 40 who are diagnosed with endometriosis are 3 times more likely to have heart problems than their healthy peers.

Endometriosis may increase about 1% or less chance of getting ovarian, breast and thyroid cancers in women compared with those without.

It results in few deaths with unadjusted and age-standardized death rates of 0.1 and 0.0 per 100,000.

Sciatic endometriosis also called catamenial or cyclical sciatica is a sciatica whose cause is endometriosis and whose incidence is unknown. Diagnosis is usually made by an MRI or CT-myelography.

Mental Health 
"Endometriosis is associated with an elevated risk of developing depression and anxiety disorders". Studies suggest this is partially due to the pelvic pain experienced by endometriosis patients.

Risk factors

Genetics
Endometriosis is a heritable condition that is influenced by both genetic and environmental factors. Children or siblings of women with endometriosis are at higher risk of developing endometriosis themselves; low progesterone levels may be genetic, and may contribute to a hormone imbalance. There is an approximate six-fold increased incidence in individuals with an affected first-degree relative.

It has been proposed that endometriosis results from a series of multiple hits within target genes, in a mechanism similar to the development of cancer. In this case, the initial mutation may be either somatic or heritable.

Individual genomic changes (found by genotyping including genome-wide association studies) that have been associated with endometriosis include 9 loci robustly replicated in various MNAs reaching genome-wide significance :

There are many findings of altered gene expression and epigenetics, but both of these can also be a secondary result of, for example, environmental factors and altered metabolism. Examples of altered gene expression include that of miRNAs.

Environmental toxins
Some factors associated with endometriosis include:
 prolonged exposure to estrogen; for example, in late menopause or early menarche
 obstruction of menstrual outflow; for example, in Müllerian anomalies

Several studies have investigated the potential link between exposure to dioxins and endometriosis, but the evidence is equivocal and potential mechanisms are poorly understood. A 2004 review of studies of dioxin and endometriosis concluded that "the human data supporting the dioxin-endometriosis association are scanty and conflicting", and a 2009 follow-up review also found that there was "insufficient evidence" in support of a link between dioxin exposure and developing endometriosis. A 2008 review concluded that more work was needed, stating that "although preliminary work suggests a potential involvement of exposure to dioxins in the pathogenesis of endometriosis, much work remains to clearly define cause and effect and to understand the potential mechanism of toxicity".

Pathophysiology

While the exact cause of endometriosis remains unknown, many theories have been presented to better understand and explain its development. These concepts do not necessarily exclude each other. The pathophysiology of endometriosis is likely to be multifactorial and to involve an interplay between several factors.

Formation
The main theories for the formation of the ectopic endometrium-like tissue include retrograde menstruation, Müllerianosis, coelomic metaplasia, vascular dissemination of stem cells, and surgical transplantation were postulated as early as 1870. Each is further described below.

Retrograde menstruation theory
The theory of retrograde menstruation (also called the implantation theory or transplantation theory) is the most commonly accepted theory for the dissemination and transformation of ectopic endometrium into endometriosis. It suggests that during a woman's menstrual flow, some of the endometrial debris flow backward through the Fallopian tubes and into the peritoneal cavity, attaching itself to the peritoneal surface (the lining of the abdominal cavity) where it can proceed to invade the tissue as or transform into endometriosis. It is not clear at what stage the transformation of endometrium, or any cell of origin such as stem cells or coelomic cells (see those theories below), to endometriosis begins.

Proofs in support of the theory are based on retrospective epidemiological studies that an association with endometrial implants attached to the peritoneal cavity, which would develop into endometrial lesions and retrograde menstruation; and the fact that animals like rodents and non-human primates whose endometrium is not shed during the estrous cycle don't develop naturally endometriosis contrary to animals that have a natural menstrual cycle like rhesus monkeys and baboons.

Retrograde menstruation alone is not able to explain all instances of endometriosis, and additional factors such as genetics, immunology, stem cell migration, and coelomic metaplasia (see "Other theories" on this page) are needed to account for disseminated disease and why many individuals with retrograde menstruation are not diagnosed with endometriosis. In addition, endometriosis has shown up in people who have never experienced menstruation including cisgender men, fetuses, and prepubescent girls. Further theoretical additions are needed to complement the retrograde menstruation theory to explain why cases of endometriosis show up in the brain and lungs. This theory has numerous other associated issues.

Researchers are investigating the possibility that the immune system may not be able to cope with the cyclic onslaught of retrograde menstrual fluid. In this context there is interest in studying the relationship of endometriosis to autoimmune disease, allergic reactions, and the impact of toxic materials.  It is still unclear what, if any, causal relationship exists between toxic materials or autoimmune disease and endometriosis. There are immune system changes in people with endometriosis, such as an increase of macrophage-derived secretion products, but it is unknown if these are contributing to the disorder or are reactions from it.

Endometriotic lesions differ in their biochemistry, hormonal response, immunology, inflammatory response when compared to endometrium. This is likely because the cells that give rise to endometriosis are a side population of cells. Similarly, there are changes in, for example, the mesothelium of the peritoneum in people with endometriosis, such as loss of tight junctions, but it is unknown if these are causes or effects of the disorder.

In rare cases where imperforate hymen does not resolve itself prior to the first menstrual cycle and goes undetected, blood and endometrium are trapped within the uterus until such time as the problem is resolved by surgical incision. Many health care practitioners never encounter this defect, and due to the flu-like symptoms it is often misdiagnosed or overlooked until multiple menstrual cycles have passed. By the time a correct diagnosis has been made, endometrium and other fluids have filled the uterus and Fallopian tubes with results similar to retrograde menstruation resulting in endometriosis. The initial stage of endometriosis may vary based on the time elapsed between onset and surgical procedure.

The theory of retrograde menstruation as a cause of endometriosis was first proposed by John A. Sampson.

Other theories
 Stem cells: Endometriosis may arise from stem cells from bone marrow and potentially other sources. In particular, this theory explains endometriosis found in areas remote from the pelvis such as the brain or lungs. Stem cells may be from local cells such as the peritoneum (see coelomic metaplasia below) or cells disseminated in the blood stream (see vascular dissemination below) such as those from the bone marrow.
 Vascular dissemination: Vascular dissemination is a 1927 theory that has been revived with new studies of bone-marrow stem cells involved in pathogenesis.
 Environment: Environmental toxins (e.g., dioxin, nickel) may cause endometriosis. Toxins such as dioxins and dioxin-like compounds tend to bioaccumulate within the human body. Further research is needed but "it is plausible that inflammatory-like processes, caused by dioxin-like environmental chemicals, can alter normal endometrial and immune cell physiology allowing persistence and development of endometrial tissue within the peritoneal cavity, normally cleared by immune system cells".
 Müllerianosis: A theory supported by foetal autopsy is that cells with the potential to become endometrial, which are laid down in tracts during embryonic development called the female reproductive (Müllerian) tract as it migrates downward at 8–10 weeks of embryonic life, could become dislocated from the migrating uterus and act like seeds or stem cells.
 Coelomic metaplasia: Coelomic cells which are the common ancestor of endometrial and peritoneal cells may undergo metaplasia (transformation) from one type of cell to the other, perhaps triggered by inflammation.
 Vasculogenesis: Up to 37% of the microvascular endothelium of ectopic endometrial tissue originates from endothelial progenitor cells, which result in de novo formation of microvessels by the process of vasculogenesis rather than the conventional process of angiogenesis.
 Neural growth: An increased expression of new nerve fibres is found in endometriosis but does not fully explain the formation of ectopic endometriotic tissue and is not definitely correlated with the amount of perceived pain.
 Autoimmune: Graves disease is an autoimmune disease characterized by hyperthyroidism, goiter, ophthalmopathy, and dermopathy. People with endometriosis had higher rates of Graves disease. One of these potential links between Graves disease and endometriosis is autoimmunity.
 Oxidative stress: Influx of iron is associated with the local destruction of the peritoneal mesothelium, leading to the adhesion of ectopic endometriotic cells. Peritoneal iron overload has been suggested to be caused by the destruction of erythrocytes, which contain the iron-binding protein hemoglobin, or a deficiency in the peritoneal iron metabolism system. Oxidative stress activity and reactive oxygen species (such as superoxide anions and peroxide levels) are reported to be higher than normal in people with endometriosis. Oxidative stress and the presence of excess ROS can damage tissue and induce rapid cellular division. Mechanistically, there are several cellular pathways by which oxidative stress may lead to or may induce proliferation of endometriotic lesions, including the mitogen activated protein (MAP) kinase pathway and the extracellular signal-related kinase (ERK) pathway. Activation of both of the MAP and ERK pathways lead to increased levels of c-Fos and c-Jun, which are proto-oncogenes that are associated with high-grade lesions.

Localization

Most often, endometriosis is found on the:
 ovaries
 fallopian tubes
 tissues that hold the uterus in place (ligaments)
 outer surface of the uterus
Less common pelvic sites are:
 vagina
 cervix
 vulva
 bowel
 bladder
 rectum

Endometriosis may spread to the cervix and vagina or to sites of a surgical abdominal incision, known as "scar endometriosis." Rectovaginal or bowel endometriosis affects approximately 5-12% of those with endometriosis, and can cause severe pain with bowel movements.

Deep infiltrating endometriosis (DIE) has been defined as the presence of endometrial glands and stroma infiltrating more than 5 mm in the subperitoneal tissue. The prevalence of DIE is estimated to be 1 to 2% in women of reproductive age. Deep endometriosis typically presents as a single nodule in the vesicouterine fold or in the lower 20 cm of the bowel. Deep endometriosis can be associated with severe pain. However, it can be present without severe levels of pain.

Extrapelvic endometriosis
Rarely, endometriosis appears in extrapelvic parts of the body, such as the lungs, brain, and skin. "Scar endometriosis" can occur in surgical abdominal incisions. Risk factors for scar endometriosis include previous abdominal surgeries, such as a hysterotomy or cesarean section, or ectopic pregnancies, salpingostomy puerperal sterilization, laparoscopy, amniocentesis, appendectomy, episiotomy, vaginal hysterectomies, and hernia repair.

Endometriosis may also present with skin lesions in cutaneous endometriosis.

Less commonly lesions can be found on the diaphragm or lungs. Diaphragmatic endometriosis is rare, almost always on the right hemidiaphragm, and may inflict the cyclic pain of the right scapula (shoulder) or cervical area (neck) during a menstrual period. Pulmonary endometriosis can be associated with a thoracic endometriosis syndrome that can include catamenial (occurs during menstruation) pneumothorax seen in 73% of women with the syndrome, catamenial hemothorax in 14%, catamenial hemoptysis in 7%, and pulmonary nodules in 6%.

Diagnosis

A health history and a physical examination can lead the health care practitioner to suspect endometriosis. There is a clear benefit for undergoing an ultrasound diagnostic procedure (TVUS) as a first step of testing for endometriosis.

For many patients, there are significant delays in diagnosis. Studies show an average delay of 11.7 years in the United States. Patients in the UK have an average delay of 8 years and in Norway of 6.7 years. A third of women had consulted their GP six or more times before being diagnosed.

The most common sites of endometriosis are the ovaries, followed by the Douglas pouch, the posterior leaves of the broad ligaments, and the sacrouterine ligaments.

As for deep infiltrating endometriosis, TVUS, TRUS and MRI are the techniques of choice for non-invasive diagnosis with a high sensitivity and specificity.

Laparoscopy

Laparoscopy, a surgical procedure where a camera is used to look inside the abdominal cavity, is the only way to accurately diagnose the extent and severity of pelvic/abdominal endometriosis. Laparoscopy is not an applicable test for extrapelvic sites such as umbilicus, hernia sacs, abdominal wall, lung, or kidneys.

Reviews in 2019 and 2020 concluded that 1) with advances in imaging, endometriosis diagnosis should no longer be considered synonymous with immediate laparoscopy for diagnosis, and 2) endometriosis should be classified a syndrome that requires confirmation of visible lesions seen at laparoscopy in addition to characteristic symptoms.

Laparoscopy permits lesion visualization unless the lesion is visible externally (e.g., an endometriotic nodule in the vagina) or is extra-abdominal. If the growths (lesions) are not visible, a biopsy must be taken to determine the diagnosis. Surgery for diagnoses also allows for surgical treatment of endometriosis at the same time.

During a laparoscopic procedure lesions can appear dark blue, powder-burn black, red, white, yellow, brown or non-pigmented. Lesions vary in size. Some within the pelvis walls may not be visible, as normal-appearing peritoneum of infertile women reveals endometriosis on biopsy in 6–13% of cases. Early endometriosis typically occurs on the surfaces of organs in the pelvic and intra-abdominal areas. Health care providers may call areas of endometriosis by different names, such as implants, lesions, or nodules.  Larger lesions may be seen within the ovaries as endometriomas or "chocolate cysts", "chocolate" because they contain a thick brownish fluid, mostly old blood.

Frequently during diagnostic laparoscopy, no lesions are found in individuals with chronic pelvic pain, a symptom common to other disorders including adenomyosis, pelvic adhesions, pelvic inflammatory disease, congenital anomalies of the reproductive tract, and ovarian or tubal masses.

Ultrasound 
Vaginal ultrasound can be used to diagnosis endometriosis, or for localizing endometrioma before surgury. This can be used to identify the spread of disease in individuals with well-established clinical suspicion of endometriosis. Vaginal ultrasound is inexpensive, easily accessible, has no contraindications and requires no preparation. By extending the ultrasound assessment into the posterior and anterior pelvic compartments a sonographer is able to evaluate structural mobility and look for deep infiltrating endometriotic nodules. Better sonographic detection of deep infiltrating endometriosis could reduce the number of diagnostic laparoscopies, as well as guide disease management and enhance patient quality of life.

Magnetic resonance imaging 
MRI is another means of detecting lesions in a non-invasive manner. MRI is not widely used due to its cost and limited availability, although it can be used to detect the most common form of endometriosis (endometrioma) with a sufficient accuracy.
It is recommended for the patient to receive an anti-spasmodic agent(i.e. hyoscine butylbromide), a big glass of water (if bladder is empty), to undergo MRI scanning in supine position and applying abdominal strap for having a better image quality from the MRI. Phased coil arrays are also recommended.

Sequences

T1W with and without suppression of fat is recommended for endometriomas; meanwhile, sagittal, axial and oblique 2D T2W are recommended for deep infiltrating endometriosis.

Staging
Surgically, endometriosis can be staged I–IV by the revised classification of the American Society of Reproductive Medicine from 1997. The process is a complex point system that assesses lesions and adhesions in the pelvic organs, but it is important to note staging assesses physical disease only, not the level of pain or infertility. A person with Stage I endometriosis may have a little disease and severe pain, while a person with Stage IV endometriosis may have severe disease and no pain or vice versa. In principle the various stages show these findings:

Stage I (Minimal)
 Findings restricted to only superficial lesions and possibly a few filmy adhesions.
Stage II (Mild)
 In addition, some deep lesions are present in the cul-de-sac.
Stage III (Moderate)
 As above, plus the presence of endometriomas on the ovary and more adhesions.
Stage IV (Severe)
 As above, plus large endometriomas, extensive adhesions. Implants and adhesions may be found beyond the uterus. Large ovarian cysts are common.

Markers
An area of research is the search for endometriosis markers.

In 2010, essentially all proposed biomarkers for endometriosis were of unclear medical use, although some appear to be promising. The one biomarker that has been in use over the last 20 years is CA-125. A 2016 review found that this biomarker was present in those with symptoms of endometriosis; and, once ovarian cancer has been ruled out, a positive CA-125 may confirm the diagnosis. Its performance in ruling out endometriosis is low. CA-125 levels appear to fall during endometriosis treatment, but it has not shown a correlation with disease response.

Another review in 2011 identified several putative biomarkers upon biopsy, including findings of small sensory nerve fibers or defectively expressed β3 integrin subunit. It has been postulated a future diagnostic tool for endometriosis will consist of a panel of several specific and sensitive biomarkers, including both substance concentrations and genetic predisposition.

A 2016 review of endometrial biomarkers for diagnosing endometriosis was unable to draw conclusions due to the low quality of the evidence.

MicroRNAs have the potential to be used in diagnostic and therapeutic decisions

Histopathology
For a histopathological diagnosis, at least two of the following three criteria should be present:
 Endometrial type stroma
 Endometrial epithelium with glands
 Evidence of chronic hemorrhage, mainly hemosiderin deposits

Immunohistochemistry has been found to be useful in diagnosing endometriosis as stromal cells have a peculiar surface antigen, CD10, thus allowing the pathologist go straight to a staining area and hence confirm the presence of stromal cells and sometimes glandular tissue is thus identified that was missed on routine H&E staining.

Pain quantification
The most common pain scale for quantification of endometriosis-related pain is the visual analogue scale (VAS); VAS and numerical rating scale (NRS) were the best adapted pain scales for pain measurement in endometriosis. For research purposes, and for more detailed pain measurement in clinical practice, VAS or NRS for each type of typical pain related to endometriosis (dysmenorrhea, deep dyspareunia and non-menstrual chronic pelvic pain), combined with the clinical global impression (CGI) and a quality of life scale, are used.

Prevention
Limited evidence indicates that the use of combined oral contraceptives is associated with a reduced risk of endometriosis, as is regular exercise and the avoidance of alcohol and caffeine.

Management
While there is no cure for endometriosis, there are two types of interventions; treatment of pain and treatment of endometriosis-associated infertility. In many cases, menopause (natural or surgical) will abate the process. In the reproductive years, endometriosis is merely managed: the goal is to provide pain relief, to restrict progression of the process, and to restore or preserve fertility where needed. In younger individuals, some surgical treatment attempts to remove endometriotic tissue and preserve the ovaries without damaging normal tissue.

Pharmacotherapy for pain management can be initiated based on the presence of symptoms and examination and ultrasound findings that rule out other potential causes.

In general, the diagnosis of endometriosis is confirmed during surgery, at which time ablative steps can be taken. Further steps depend on circumstances: someone without infertility can manage symptoms with pain medication and hormonal medication that suppresses the natural cycle, while an infertile individual may be treated expectantly after surgery, with fertility medication, or with IVF.

A 2020 Cochrane systematic review found that for all types of endometriosis, "it is uncertain whether laparoscopic surgery improves overall pain compared to diagnostic laparoscopy".

Surgery

Surgery, if done, should generally be performed laparoscopically (through keyhole surgery) rather than open. Treatment consists of the ablation or excision of the endometriosis, electrocoagulation, lysis of adhesions, resection of endometriomas, and restoration of normal pelvic anatomy as much as is possible. When laparoscopic surgery is used, small instruments are inserted through the incisions to remove the endometriosis tissue and adhesions. Because the incisions are very small, there will only be small scars on the skin after the procedure, and most individuals recover from surgery quickly and have a reduced risk of adhesions. Many endometriosis specialists believe that excision is the ideal surgical method to treat endometriosis.

As for deep endometriosis, a segmental resection or shaving of nodules is effective but is associated with an important rate of complications which about 4,6% is major.

Historically, a hysterectomy (removal of the uterus) was thought to be a cure for endometriosis in individuals who do not wish to conceive. Removal of the uterus may be beneficial as part of the treatment, if the uterus itself is affected by adenomyosis. However, this should only be done in combination with removal of the endometriosis by excision. If endometriosis is not also removed at the time of hysterectomy, pain may persist.

Presacral neurectomy may be performed where the nerves to the uterus are cut. However, this technique is not usually used due to the high incidence of associated complications including presacral hematoma and irreversible problems with urination and constipation.

Recurrence
The underlying process that causes endometriosis may not cease after a surgical or medical intervention. A study has shown that dysmenorrhea recurs at a rate of 30 percent within a year following laparoscopic surgery. Resurgence of lesions tend to appear in the same location if the lesions were not completely removed during surgery. It has been shown that laser ablation resulted in higher and earlier recurrence rates when compared with endometrioma cystectomy; and recurrence after repetitive laparoscopy was similar to that after the first surgery. Endometriosis can come back after hysterectomy and bilateral salpingo-oophorectomy. It has 10% recurrent rate.

Endometriosis recurrence following conservative surgery is estimated as 21.5% at 2 years and 40-50% at 5 years.

Recurrence rate for DIE after surgery is less than 1%.

Risks and safety of pelvic surgery
Risk of developing complications following surgery depend on the type of the lesion that has undergone surgery.
55% to 100% of individuals develop adhesions following pelvic surgery, which can result in infertility, chronic abdominal and pelvic pain, and difficult reoperative surgery. Trehan's temporary ovarian suspension, a technique in which the ovaries are suspended for a week after surgery, may be used to reduce the incidence of adhesions after endometriosis surgery.
Removal of cysts on the ovary without removing the ovary is a safe procedure.

Hormonal medications

 Hormonal birth control therapy: Birth control pills reduce the menstrual pain and recurrence rate for endometrioma following conservative surgery for endometriosis. A 2018 Cochrane systematic review found that there is insufficient evidence to make a judgement on the effectiveness of the combined oral contraceptive pill compared with placebo or other medical treatment for managing pain associated with endometriosis partly because of lack of included studies for data analysis (only two for COCP vs placebo).
 Progestogens: Progesterone counteracts estrogen and inhibits the growth of the endometrium. Danazol (Danocrine) and gestrinone (Dimetrose, Nemestran) are suppressive steroids with some androgenic activity. Both agents inhibit the growth of endometriosis but their use has declined, due in part to virilizing side effects such as excessive hair growth and voice changes. There is tentative evidence based on cohort studies that dienogest and norethisterone acetate (NETA) may help patients with DIE in terms of pain. There is tentative evidence based on a prospective study that vaginal danazol reduces pain in those affected by DIE.
 Gonadotropin-releasing hormone (GnRH) modulators: These drugs include GnRH agonists such as leuprorelin (Lupron) and GnRH antagonists such as elagolix (Orilissa) and are thought to work by decreasing estrogen levels. A 2010 Cochrane review found that GnRH modulators were more effective for pain relief in endometriosis than no treatment or placebo, but were not more effective than danazol or intrauterine progestogen, and had more side effects than danazol. A 2018 Swedish systematic review found that GnRH modulators had similar pain-relieving effects to gestagen, but also decreased bone density.
 Aromatase inhibitors are medications that block the formation of estrogen and have become of interest for researchers who are treating endometriosis. Examples of aromatase inhibitors include anastrozole and letrozole. Evidence for aromatase inhibitors is confirmed by numerous controlled studies that show benefit in terms of pain control and quality of life when used in combination with gestagens or oral contraceptives with less side-effects when used in combination with oral contraceptives like norethisterone acetate. Despite multiple benefits, there are lot of things to consider before using AIs for endometriosis, as it is common for them to induce functional cysts as an adverse effects. Moreover, dosages, treatment length, appropriate add-back therapies and mode of administration is still being investigated.
 Progesterone receptor modulators like mifepristone and gestrinone have the potential (based on only one RCT each) to be used as a treatment to manage pain caused by endometriosis.

Other medicines
 Melatonin, there is tentative evidence for its use (at a dose of 10 mg) in reducing pain related to endometriosis.
 Opioids: Morphine sulphate tablets and other opioid painkillers work by mimicking the action of naturally occurring pain-reducing chemicals called "endorphins". There are different long acting and short acting medications that can be used alone or in combination to provide appropriate pain control.
 Chinese herbal medicine was reported to have comparable benefits to gestrinone and danazol in patients who had had laparoscopic surgery, though the review notes that the two trials were small and of "poor methodological quality" and results should be "interpreted cautiously" as  better quality research is needed.
 Serrapeptase, a Digestive enzyme found in the intestines of silkworms. Serrapeptase is widely used in Japan and Europe as an anti-inflammatory treatment. More research is needed but serrapeptase may be used by endometriosis patients to reduce inflammation.
 Angiogenesis inhibitors lack clinical evidence of efficacy in endometriosis therapy. Under experimental in vitro and in vivo conditions, compounds that have been shown to exert inhibitory effects on endometriotic lesions include growth factor inhibitors, endogenous angiogenesis inhibitors, fumagillin analogues, statins, cyclo-oxygenase-2 inhibitors, phytochemical compounds, immunomodulators, dopamine agonists, peroxisome proliferator-activated receptor agonists, progestins, danazol and gonadotropin-releasing hormone agonists. However, many of these agents are associated with undesirable side effects and more research is necessary. An ideal therapy would diminish inflammation and underlying symptoms without being contraceptive.
 Pentoxifylline, an immunomodulating agent, has been theorized to improve pain as well as improve pregnancy rates in individuals with endometriosis.There is not enough evidence to support the effectiveness or safety of either of these uses. Current American Congress of Obstetricians and Gynecologists (ACOG) guidelines do not include immunomodulators, such as pentoxifylline, in standard treatment protocols.
 NSAIDs are anti-inflammatory medications commonly used for endometriosis patients despite unproven efficacy and unintended adverse effects.
 Neuromodulators like gabapentin did not prove to be superior to placebo in managing pain caused by endometriosis.

The overall effectiveness of manual physical therapy to treat endometriosis has not yet been identified.

Comparison of interventions
A 2021 meta-analysis found that GnRH analogues and combined hormonal contraceptives were the best treatment for reducing dyspareunia, menstrual and non menstrual pelvic pain. A 2018 Swedish systematic review found a large number of studies but a general lack of scientific evidence for most treatments. There was only one study of sufficient quality and relevance comparing the effect of surgery and non-surgery. Cohort studies indicate that surgery is effective in decreasing pain. Most complications occurred in cases of low intestinal anastomosis, while risk of fistula occurred in cases of combined abdominal or vaginal surgery, and urinary tract problems were common in intestinal surgery. The evidence was found to be insufficient regarding surgical intervention.

The advantages of physical therapy techniques are decreased cost, absence of major side-effects, it does not interfere with fertility, and near-universal increase of sexual function. Disadvantages are that there are no large or long-term studies of its use for treating pain or infertility related to endometriosis.

Treatment of infertility

Surgery is more effective than medicinal intervention for addressing infertility associated with endometriosis. Surgery attempts to remove endometrium-like tissue and preserve the ovaries without damaging normal tissue. Receiving hormonal suppression therapy after surgery might be positive regarding endometriosis recurrence and pregnancy. In-vitro fertilization (IVF) procedures are effective in improving fertility in many individuals with endometriosis.

During fertility treatment, the ultralong pretreatment with GnRH-agonist has a higher chance of resulting in pregnancy for individuals with endometriosis, compared to the short pretreatment.

Research
Preliminary research on mouse models showed that monoclonal antibodies, as well as inhibitors of MyD88 downstream signaling pathway, can reduce lesion volume. Thanks to that, clinical trials are being done on using a monoclonal antibody directed against IL-33 and using anakinra, an IL-1 receptor antagonist.

Promising preclinical outcomes is pushing clinical trials into testing cannabinoid extracts, dichloroacetic acid and curcuma capsules.

Epidemiology
Determining how many people have endometriosis is challenging because definitive diagnosis requires surgical visualization through laparoscopic surgery. Criteria that are commonly used to establish a diagnosis include pelvic pain, infertility, surgical assessment, and in some cases, magnetic resonance imaging. An ultrasound can identify large clumps of tissue as potential endometriosis lesions and ovarian cysts but it is not effective for all patients, especially in cases with smaller, superficial lesions.

These studies suggest that endometriosis affects approximately 11% of women in the general population. Endometriosis is most common in those in their thirties and forties; however, it can begin as early as 8 years old. Endometriosis is estimated to affect over 190 million women in their reproductive years.

It chiefly affects adults from premenarche to postmenopause, regardless of race or ethnicity or whether or not they have had children. It is primarily a disease of the reproductive years.  Incidences of endometriosis have occurred in postmenopausal individuals, and in less common cases, individuals may have had endometriosis symptoms before they even reach menarche.

The rate of recurrence of endometriosis is estimated to be 40-50% for adults over a 5-year period. The rate of recurrence has been shown to increase with time from surgery and is not associated with the stage of the disease, initial site, surgical method used, or post-surgical treatment.

History
Endometriosis was first discovered microscopically by Karl von Rokitansky in 1860, although the earliest antecedents may have stemmed from concepts published almost 4,000 years ago.  The Hippocratic Corpus outlines symptoms similar to endometriosis, including uterine ulcers, adhesions, and infertility. Historically, women with these symptoms were treated with leeches, straitjackets, bloodletting, chemical douches, genital mutilation, pregnancy (as a form of treatment), hanging upside down, surgical intervention, and even killing due to suspicion of demonic possession. Hippocratic doctors recognized and treated chronic pelvic pain as a true organic disorder 2,500 years ago, but during the Middle Ages, there was a shift into believing that women with pelvic pain were mad, immoral, imagining the pain, or simply misbehaving. The symptoms of inexplicable chronic pelvic pain were often attributed to imagined madness, female weakness, promiscuity, or hysteria.  The historical diagnosis of hysteria, which was thought to be a psychological disease, may have indeed been endometriosis.  The idea that chronic pelvic pain was related to mental illness influenced modern attitudes regarding individuals with endometriosis, leading to delays in correct diagnosis and indifference to the patients' true pain throughout the 20th and into the 21st century.

Hippocratic doctors believed that delaying childbearing could trigger diseases of the uterus, which caused endometriosis-like symptoms. Women with dysmenorrhea were encouraged to marry and have children at a young age. The fact that Hippocratics were recommending changes in marriage practices due to an endometriosis-like illness implies that this disease was likely common, with rates higher than the 5-15% prevalence that is often cited today.  If indeed this disorder was so common historically, this may point away from modern theories that suggest links between endometriosis and dioxins, PCBs, and chemicals.

The early treatment of endometriosis was surgical and included oophorectomy (removal of the ovaries) and hysterectomy (removal of the uterus). In the 1940s, the only available hormonal therapies for endometriosis were high-dose testosterone and high-dose estrogen therapy. High-dose estrogen therapy with diethylstilbestrol for endometriosis was first reported by Karnaky in 1948 and was the main pharmacological treatment for the condition in the early 1950s. Pseudopregnancy (high-dose estrogen–progestogen therapy) for endometriosis was first described by Kistner in the late 1950s. Pseudopregnancy as well as progestogen monotherapy dominated the treatment of endometriosis in the 1960s and 1970s. These agents, although efficacious, were associated with intolerable side effects. Danazol was first described for endometriosis in 1971 and became the main therapy in the 1970s and 1980s. In the 1980s GnRH agonists gained prominence for the treatment of endometriosis and by the 1990s had become the most widely used therapy. Oral GnRH antagonists such as elagolix were introduced for the treatment of endometriosis in 2018.

Society and culture

Public figures
A number of public figures have spoken about their experience with endometriosis, including:

 Emma Barnett
 Emma Bunton
 Danielle Collins
 Abby Finkenauer
 Whoopi Goldberg
 Mel Greig
 Halsey
 Emma Hayes
 Julianne Hough
 Bridget Hustwaite
 Bindi Irwin
 Padma Lakshmi
 Dolly Parton
 Daisy Ridley
 Emma Roberts
 Kirsten Storms
 Chrissy Teigen
 Emma Watkins
 Leah Williamson

Economic burden
The economic burden of endometriosis is widespread and multifaceted. Endometriosis is a chronic disease that has direct and indirect costs which include loss of work days, direct costs of treatment, symptom management, and treatment of other associated conditions such as depression or chronic pain. One factor which seems to be associated with especially high costs is the delay between onset of symptoms and diagnosis.

Costs vary greatly between countries. Two factors that contribute to the economic burden include healthcare costs and losses in productivity. A Swedish study of 400 endometriosis patients found "Absence from work was reported by 32% of the women, while 36% reported reduced time at work because of endometriosis". An additional cross sectional study with Puerto Rican women, "found that endometriosis-related and coexisting symptoms disrupted all aspects of women's daily lives, including physical limitations that affected doing household chores and paid employment. The majority of women (85%) experienced a decrease in the quality of their work; 20% reported being unable to work because of pain, and over two-thirds of the sample continued to work despite their pain."

Medical culture
There are a number of barriers that those affected face to receiving diagnosis and treatment for endometriosis. Some of these include outdated standards for laparoscopic evaluation, stigma about discussing menstruation and sex, lack of understanding of the disease, primary care physicians lack of knowledge, and assumptions about typical menstrual pain. On average, those later diagnosed with endometriosis waited 2.3 years after the onset of symptoms before seeking treatment and nearly three quarters of women receive a misdiagnosis prior to endometriosis. Self-help groups say practitioners delay making the diagnosis, often because they do not consider it a possibility. There is a typical delay of 7–12 years from symptom onset in affected individuals to professional diagnosis. There is a general lack of knowledge about endometriosis among primary care physicians. Half of general health care providers surveyed in a 2013 study were unable to name three symptoms of endometriosis. Health care providers are also likely to dismiss described symptoms as normal menstruation. Younger patients may also feel uncomfortable discussing symptoms with a physician.

Race and ethnicity
Race and ethnicity may play a role in how endometriosis affects one's life. Endometriosis is less thoroughly studied among Black people, and the research that has been done is outdated. Black people with endometriosis may face barriers in receiving care due to racist misconceptions about how Black people feel pain. Since pain is the primary symptom of endometriosis, this makes it increasingly possible for doctors to dismiss pain symptoms when their patient is Black. An inaccurate diagnosis is also more likely since Black women are at a higher risk for other related conditions such as uterine fibroids.

Cultural differences among ethnic groups also contribute to attitudes toward and treatment of endometriosis, especially in Hispanic or Latino communities. A study done in Puerto Rico in 2020 found that health care and interactions with friends and family related to discussing endometriosis were affected by stigma. The most common finding was a referral to those expressing pain related to endometriosis as "changuería" or "changas", terms used in Puerto Rico to describe pointless whining and complaining, often directed at children.

References

External links 

 
 Endometriosis fact sheet from womenshealth.gov
 Fact Sheet Endometriosis Fact Sheet from the World Health Organization

Noninflammatory disorders of female genital tract
Menstrual cycle
Wikipedia medicine articles ready to translate
Endometriosis